Hamlin is a census-designated place (CDP) in Monroe County, New York, United States. The population was 5,521 at the 2010 census.

Demographics

References

Census-designated places in Monroe County, New York
Census-designated places in New York (state)